Mossø is Denmark's third largest freshwater lake and Jutland's largest, as measured by surface area. The lake is located just west of the city of Skanderborg in east Jutland, but is part of both Skanderborg Municipality and Horsens Municipality. Mossø lies in the middle of the area and landscape known as Søhøjlandet (English: The Lake-highland).

There is a small lake named Mossø in the forest of Rold Skov in Himmerland.

Nature 
Both ospreys and white-tailed eagle is regularly observed at Mossø and the later have recently established here as a breeding bird, which is rare in Denmark.

Mossø is part of the 4,470 ha Natura 2000 protection area, designated as number 52. The lake is also designated as an international bird protection area, with number F35.

References

Sources
 Statistical Yearbook 2013 Statistics Denmark
 Mossø and surrounding lakes National Survey and Cadastre of Denmark (KMS) 2012. Basic numbers. 
 Mossø Skanderborg Municipality, Horsens Municipality, Danish Ministry for the Environment, 2008

External links

 Map of Mossø Danish Nature Agency

Lakes of Jutland
Natura 2000 in Denmark
Skanderborg Municipality
Horsens Municipality